Coolidge may refer to:

People
 Coolidge (surname), including a list of people and characters with the name
 Calvin Coolidge (1872–1933), 30th president of the United States

Places

United States
 Coolidge, Arizona
 Coolidge, Georgia
 Coolidge, Kansas
 Coolidge, Montana, a ghost town.
 Coolidge, Texas
 Coolidge, Wisconsin, a ghost town
 Coolidge Corner, Brookline, Massachusetts
 Calvin Coolidge State Forest, Vermont
 Coolidge Range of the Green Mountains, Vermont

Sports venues
Coolidge Cricket Ground a first-class cricket venue in Antigua

Other
 Coolidge effect
 SS President Coolidge